is a Japanese term used in modern martial arts as well as in tea ceremony, flower arranging, Go, shogi, academic tests and other similar activities to designate various grades, levels or degrees of proficiency or experience. In Mandarin Chinese, the same character  is pronounced jí, and the term is used for academic tests. In Korea, the term geup is used (also transliterated as gup or kup). In Vietnamese martial arts, it is known as cấp (khớp).

History
The Tokyo Metropolitan Police Department started a ranking system using kyū to measure the police officers' ability in Kendo. Grades were from 8th to 1st.

In the 1890s, the Greater Japan Martial Virtue Society introduced the dan and kyū ranking system to various martial arts in Japan.

Martial arts usage

In modern Japanese martial arts, kyū-level practitioners hold the ranks below dan or black belt. The kyū ranking system varies from art to art and school to school. In some arts, all the kyū-level practitioners wear white belts while in others different coloured belts, tags or stripes are used; in kendo for example the belt system is not used. Although some aikido schools do use a coloured belt system the norm is for kyū grades to wear a white belt, and for dan grades to wear a black belt. Kyū-level practitioners are often called , "ones without dan, and are considered as initiates rather than students. When practitioners have reached the ranking of first degree black belt, they become .

Academic tests usage
Martial arts' organizations are not the only ones who use such a system. Some academic and professional organizations also use kyū and dan as measures of a person's ability. For instance, the Japan Kanji Aptitude Test which tests a person's ability to correctly read, write, and use kanji, is graded using kyū.

List of kyū ranks
Kyū ranks progress using a descending order system, so 1st kyū is the highest. For example, the first kyū outranks the 2nd kyū. The Dan ranking system starts after 1st kyū. Essentially, the kyū is the number of steps before reaching mastery whereas the dan gives steps into mastery.

Pre-1st kyū and pre-2nd kyū are used in examinations of languages, because it is often hard to pass the examinations at 1st and 2nd kyū.

The lowest kyū is sometimes called "Mukyū" which means "ungraded" in English. The lowest kyū depends on organizations. For instance, the United States Judo Federation has 12th kyū as the lowest grade for junior class, and 7th kyū as the lowest for adult class.

In Japan, the difficulty is classified into three categories as in the following list:

Coloured belts

In some styles, students wear white belts until they receive their first dan rank or black belt, while in others a range of colors are used for different kyū grades. The wearing of coloured belts is often associated with kyū ranks, particularly in modern martial arts such as karate and judo (where the practice originated). However, there is no standard association of belt colours with particular ranks and different schools and organizations assign colours independently; see Rank in Judo for examples of variation within an art. However, white is often the lowest ranked belt and brown is the highest kyū rank, and it is common to see the darker colors associated with the higher ranks, i.e., the closest to black belt.

The system of using different colored belts to mark rank is not universally accepted in the martial arts. Supporters of the belt colors point out their use as a simple visual key for experience, such as in matching opponents for sparring, allowing opponents to somewhat accurately judge each other's skill, and to split them for competitions. Those who oppose the use of coloured belts are also often concerned that students will worry too much about relative rank, and become arrogant with trivial promotions and differences, while supporters feel that by providing small signs of success and recognition, students are more confident, and their training is more structured, and that the ranking system encourages higher-ranked students to assist lower-ranked ones, and lower-ranked students to respect their seniors.

See also 

 Dan (rank)
 Rank in Judo
 Go ranks and ratings
 Karate ranks

References

External links 
 

Go ranks and ratings
Titles and rank in Japanese martial arts